Robin Lorenz Oscar Linschoten  (born 17 October 1956 in Ugchelen) is a former Dutch politician of the People's Party for Freedom and Democracy (VVD).

Linschoten was an MP from 1982 to 1994, and State Secretary for Social Affairs from 1994 to 1996 in the First Kok cabinet.

References 
  Parlement.com biography

1956 births
Living people
Members of the House of Representatives (Netherlands)
People from Apeldoorn
People's Party for Freedom and Democracy politicians
State Secretaries for Social Affairs of the Netherlands